122nd meridian may refer to:

122nd meridian east, a line of longitude east of the Greenwich Meridian
122nd meridian west, a line of longitude west of the Greenwich Meridian